This is a list of summer schools of linguistics.

 : European Summer School in Logic, Language and Information (ESSLLI) - Hamburg (2008)
 : Forensic Linguistics Short Course (FLsc) - Düsseldorf
 : Summer School on Corpus Phonology - Augsburg (2008)
 : The Crete Summer School of Linguistics (CreteLing) - Rethimnon (2022)
 : European Summer School in Generative Grammar (EGG) - Debrecen (2014)
 : Summer Institute "Languages and Cultures in Contact / in Contrast" - Zakopane (2008)
 : NOVA - Lisbon Summer School and Graduate Conference in Linguistics - Lisbon
 : U. Minho - APL Summer School of Linguistics 2015: Experimental Methods in Syntax - Braga
 : International Summer School in Forensic Linguistic Analysis - Birmingham (2000-2010)
 : Summer Institute of Linguistics - University of North Dakota (every summer)
 : Linguistics Society of America Summer Institutes, held in odd-numbered years, including:
 Empirical Foundations for Theories of Language - Stanford (2007)
 Linguistic Structure and Language Ecologies - UC Berkeley (2009)
 Language in the World - University of Colorado at Boulder (2011)
 Universality and Variability - University of Michigan (2013)
 Linguistic Theory in a World of Big Data - University of Chicago (2015)
 Language Across Space and Time - University of Kentucky (2017)
 InField (Institute on Field Linguistics and Language Documentation) and its successor CoLang (Institute on Collaborative Language Research), held in even-numbered years, including:
 : InField - University of California, Santa Barbara (2008)
 : InField - University of Oregon (2010)
 : CoLang - University of Kansas (2012)
 : CoLang - University of Texas at Arlington (2014)
 : CoLang - University of Alaska Fairbanks (2016)
 : CoLang - University of Florida (2018)
 : Leiden Summer School in Languages and Linguistics - Leiden
 : LOT Winter School - Leiden/Amsterdam/Nijmegen/Groningen/Utrecht (fixed rotation)
 : LOT Summer School - Leiden/Amsterdam/Nijmegen/Groningen/Utrecht (fixed rotation)
 : Utrecht Summer School - Utrecht (2010)
 : International Summer School Oslo - Oslo (2011)
 : NYI Institute of Linguistics, Cognition and Culture - St. Petersburg every summer since 2003
 : International School in Linguistic Fieldwork (FieldLing)  every summer since 2010

See also

 Lists of schools
 List of schools of linguistics

References 

Lists of schools
Summer schools